Timothy J. Corrigan (born February 21, 1956) is the Chief United States district judge of the  United States District Court for the Middle District of Florida.

Personal life and education
Corrigan was born in 1956 in Jacksonville, Florida. He received his Bachelor of Arts degree in 1978 from the University of Notre Dame and his Juris Doctor from Duke University School of Law in 1981.

Legal career
Corrigan served as a law clerk to Judge Gerald B. Tjoflat of the United States Court of Appeals for the Eleventh Circuit from 1981 to 1982. He was in private practice in Florida from 1982 to 1996, and served as an adjunct instructor at the Duke University School of Law from 1985 to 1996. Corrigan served as a United States magistrate judge of the United States District Court for the Middle District of Florida from 1996 to 2002, and was an adjunct professor at the Florida Coastal School of Law in 1999.

Federal judicial service 
President George W. Bush nominated Corrigan to the United States District Court for the Middle District of Florida on May 22, 2002, to a new seat created by 113 Stat. 1501. He was confirmed by the Senate on September 12, 2002, he received  his commission the next day. He became Chief Judge on November 2, 2020.

Assassination attempt
In June 2013, Corrigan was the victim of an assassination attempt. A bullet fired by Aaron Richardson, a criminal defendant whom Corrigan had earlier sentenced, into Corrigan's home missed him by less than two inches, although he suffered superficial wounds from broken glass. In June 2016, Richardson was sentenced to 343 years in prison for the attempt and related charges.

References

Sources

1956 births
Living people
21st-century American judges
Duke University School of Law alumni
Judges of the United States District Court for the Middle District of Florida
People from Jacksonville, Florida
United States district court judges appointed by George W. Bush
United States magistrate judges
University of Notre Dame alumni